

Events

Medal table

See also
 List of Pan American Games medalists in table tennis

References

 

Events at the 1991 Pan American Games
Pan American Games
1991